Bells Independent School District is a public school district based in Bells, Texas (U.S.).

Finances
As of the 2010–2011 school year, the appraised valuation of property in the district was $195,896,000. The maintenance tax rate was $0.117 and the bond tax rate was $0.028 per $100 of appraised valuation.

For the 2018–19 school year, the district had revenues of  million and expenditures of  million.

Academic achievement
In 2011, the school district was rated "recognized" by the Texas Education Agency.

Schools
 Bells High School (Grades 9–12) (289 students, 2021–22)
 Pritchard Junior High (Grades 6–8) (208 students, 2021–22)
 Bells Elementary (Pre-K–5) (388 students, 2021–22)

See also

List of school districts in Texas

References

External links
 

School districts in Grayson County, Texas